Greek may refer to:

Greece
Anything of, from, or related to Greece, a country in Southern Europe:
Greeks, an ethnic group.
Greek language, a branch of the Indo-European language family.
Proto-Greek language, the assumed last common ancestor of all known varieties of Greek.
Mycenaean Greek, most ancient attested form of the language (16th to 11th centuries BC).
Ancient Greek, forms of the language used c. 1000–330 BC.
Koine Greek, common form of Greek spoken and written during Classical antiquity.
Medieval Greek or Byzantine Language, language used between the Middle Ages and the Ottoman conquest of Constantinople.
Modern Greek, varieties spoken in the modern era (from 1453 AD).
Greek alphabet, script used to write the Greek language.
Greek Orthodox Church, several Churches of the Eastern Orthodox Church.
Ancient Greece, the ancient civilization before the end of Antiquity.
Old Greek, the language as spoken from Late Antiquity to around 1500 AD.
Greek mythology, A Body of Myth's Originally told by the Ancient Greeks.

Other uses
Greek (play), 1980 play by Steven Berkoff.
Greek (opera), 1988 opera by Mark-Antony Turnage, based on Steven Berkoff's play.
Greek (TV series) (also stylized GRΣΣK), 2007 ABC Family channel's comedy-drama television series set at a fictitious college's fictional Greek system.
Greeks (finance), quantities representing the sensitivity of the price of derivatives.
Greeking, a style of displaying or rendering text or symbols in a computer display or typographic layout.
Greek-letter organizations (GLOs), social organizations for undergraduate students at North American colleges.
Greek Theatre (Los Angeles), a theatre located at Griffith Park in Los Angeles, California.
Greek Revival, an architectural movement of the late 18th and early 19th centuries.
Greek love, a term referring variously to male bonding, homosexuality, pederasty and anal sex.
.The Greek, a fictional character on the HBO drama The Wire.
The Greeks (book), a 1951 non-fiction book on classical Greece by HDF Kitto.
Greeks, a group of scholars in 16th-century England who were part of the Grammarians' War.

See also
.
Greeks (disambiguation).
Greek dialects (disambiguation).
Hellenic (disambiguation).
Names of the Greeks, terms for the Greek people.
Name of Greece, names for the country.
Greek to me, an idiom for something not understandable.

Language and nationality disambiguation pages